In the mathematical field of group theory, an Artin transfer is a certain homomorphism from an arbitrary finite or infinite group to the commutator quotient group of a subgroup of finite index. Originally, such mappings arose as group theoretic counterparts of class extension homomorphisms of abelian extensions of algebraic number fields by applying Artin's reciprocity maps to ideal class groups and analyzing the resulting homomorphisms between quotients of Galois groups. However, independently of number theoretic applications, a partial order on the kernels and targets of Artin transfers has recently turned out to be compatible with parent-descendant relations between finite p-groups (with a prime number p), which can be visualized in descendant trees. Therefore, Artin transfers provide a valuable tool for the classification of finite p-groups and for searching and identifying particular groups in descendant trees by looking for patterns defined by the kernels and targets of Artin transfers. These strategies of pattern recognition are useful in purely group theoretic context, as well as for applications in algebraic number theory concerning Galois groups of higher p-class fields and Hilbert p-class field towers.

Transversals of a subgroup
Let  be a group and  be a subgroup of finite index 

Definitions.

Remark. Of course, this element with subscript  which represents the principal coset (i.e., the subgroup  itself) may be, but need not be, replaced by the neutral element .

Lemma. Let  be a non-abelian group with subgroup .

Proof. Since the mapping  is an involution of  we see that:

For a normal subgroup  we have  for each .

We must check when the image of a transversal under a homomorphism is also a transversal.

Proposition.
 is a left transversal of the subgroup  in the image  with finite index 

Proof. As a mapping of sets  maps the union to another union:

but weakens the equality for the intersection to a trivial inclusion:
 
Suppose for some :
 
then there exists elements  such that

Then we have:

Conversely if  then there exists  such that  But the homomorphism  maps the disjoint cosets  to equal cosets:

Remark. We emphasize the important equivalence of the proposition in a formula:

Permutation representation
Suppose  is a left transversal of a subgroup  of finite index  in a group .

Definition. The mappings:

Definition. The mappings:

Lemma. For the right transversal  associated to the left transversal , we have the following relations between the monomials and permutations corresponding to an element :

Proof. For the right transversal , we have , for each . On the other hand, for the left transversal , we have

Artin transfer

Definitions.

Similarly we define:

Remarks. Isaacs calls the mappings

Taking the natural epimorphism

yields the preceding definition of the Artin transfer  in its original form by Schur and by Emil Artin, which has also been dubbed Verlagerung by Hasse. Note that, in general, the pre-transfer is neither independent of the transversal nor a group homomorphism.

Independence of the transversal

Proposition.

Proof. Then there exists a unique permutation  such that:

Consequently:

For a fixed element , there exists a unique permutation  such that:

we have:

as defined in formula (5).

Proposition.

Proof. Similar to the previous proposition.

Proposition.

Proof. Using formula (4) and  being abelian we have:

The last step is justified by the fact that the Artin transfer is a homomorphism. This will be shown in the following section.

Corollary.

Artin transfers as homomorphisms

Theorem. The Artin transfer

and the permutation representation:

are group homomorphisms:

Let :

This relation simultaneously shows that the Artin transfer and the permutation representation are homomorphisms.

It is illuminating to restate the homomorphism property of the Artin transfer in terms of the monomial representation. The images of the factors  are given by

In the last proof, the image of the product  turned out to be

,

which is a very peculiar law of composition discussed in more detail in the following section.

Wreath product of H and S(n)

Definition. For , the wreath product of the associated monomials and permutations is given by

Theorem. With this law of composition on  the monomial representation 
 
is an injective homomorphism.

The homomorphism property has been shown above already. For a homomorphism to be injective, it suffices to show the triviality of its kernel.

Finally, an application of the inverse inner automorphism with  yields , as required for injectivity.

Remark. The monomial representation of the theorem stands in contrast to the permutation representation, which cannot be injective if 

Remark. Whereas Huppert uses the monomial representation for defining the Artin transfer, we prefer to give the immediate definitions in formulas (5) and (6) and to merely illustrate the homomorphism property of the Artin transfer with the aid of the monomial representation.

Composition of Artin transfers

Theorem. Let  be a group with nested subgroups  such that  and  Then the Artin transfer  is the compositum of the induced transfer  and the Artin transfer , that is:
.

Then, anticipating the definition of the induced transfer, we have

resp.

Therefore, the image of  under the Artin transfer  is given by

Finally, we want to emphasize the structural peculiarity of the monomial representation

which corresponds to the composite of Artin transfers, defining

for a permutation , and using the symbolic notation  for all pairs of subscripts , .

The preceding proof has shown that

The action on the second component  depends on the first component  (via the permutation ), whereas the action on the first component  is independent of the second component . Therefore, the permutation  can be identified with the multiplet

which will be written in twisted form in the next section.

Wreath product of S(m) and S(n)
The permutations , which arose as second components of the monomial representation

in the previous section, are of a very special kind. They belong to the stabilizer of the natural equipartition of the set  into the  rows of the corresponding matrix (rectangular array).

The above considerations establish a third representation, the stabilizer representation,

of the group  in the wreath product , similar to the permutation representation and the monomial representation. As opposed to the latter, the stabilizer representation cannot be injective, in general. For instance, certainly not, if  is infinite. Formula (10) proves the following statement.

Theorem. The stabilizer representation

of the group  in the wreath product  of symmetric groups is a group homomorphism.

Cycle decomposition
Let  be a left transversal of a subgroup  of finite index  in a group  and  be its associated permutation representation.

Theorem. Suppose the permutation  decomposes into pairwise disjoint (and thus commuting) cycles  of lengths  which is unique up to the ordering of the cycles. More explicitly, suppose

Then:

Define:

Consequently,

The cycle decomposition corresponds to a  double coset decomposition of :

It was this cycle decomposition form of the transfer homomorphism which was given by E. Artin in his original 1929 paper.

Transfer to a normal subgroup
Let  be a normal subgroup of finite index  in a group . Then we have , for all , and there exists the quotient group  of order .

Theorem. Then the image of  under the Artin transfer  is given by:
.

Hence, the formula for the image of  under the Artin transfer  in the previous section takes the particular shape

Corollary. In particular, the inner transfer of an element  is given as a symbolic power:

with the trace element

It is simply an th power

.

with the trace element

For these intermediate groups we have the following lemma.

Lemma. All subgroups containing the commutator subgroup are normal.

Let .

Explicit implementations of Artin transfers in the simplest situations are presented in the following section.

Computational implementation

Abelianization of type (p,p)
Let  be a p-group with abelianization  of elementary abelian type . Then  has  maximal subgroups  of index 

Lemma. In this particular case, the Frattini subgroup, which is defined as the intersection of all maximal subgroups coincides with the commutator subgroup.

Proof. To see this note that due to the abelian type of  the commutator subgroup contains all p-th powers  and thus we have .

For each , let  be the Artin transfer homomorphism.

A convenient selection is given by

Then, for each  we use equations (16) and (18) to implement the inner and outer transfers:

,

The complete specification of the Artin transfers  also requires explicit knowledge of the derived subgroups .

Abelianization of type (p2,p)
Let  be a p-group with abelianization  of non-elementary abelian type . Then  has  maximal subgroups  of index  and  subgroups  of index  For each  let

be the Artin transfer homomorphisms. Burnside's basis theorem asserts that the group  can be generated by two elements  such that 

We begin by considering the first layer of subgroups. For each of the normal subgroups , we select a generator

such that . These are the cases where the factor group  is cyclic of order . However, for the distinguished maximal subgroup , for which the factor group  is bicyclic of type , we need two generators:

such that . Further, a generator  of a transversal must be given such that , for each . It is convenient to define

Then, for each , we have inner and outer transfers:

Now we continue by considering the second layer of subgroups. For each of the normal subgroups , we select a generator

such that . Among these subgroups, the Frattini subgroup  is particularly distinguished. A uniform way of defining generators  of a transversal such that , is to set

exceptionally

The structure of the derived subgroups  and  must be known to specify the action of the Artin transfers completely.

Transfer kernels and targets
Let  be a group with finite abelianization . Suppose that  denotes the family of all subgroups which contain  and are therefore necessarily normal, enumerated by a finite index set .

Definition. Both families are also called multiplets whereas a single component will be referred to as a singulet.

Important examples for these concepts are provided in the following two sections.

Abelianization of type (p,p)
Let  be a p-group with abelianization  of elementary abelian type . Then  has  maximal subgroups  of index . For  let  denote the Artin transfer homomorphism.

Definition.

Remark. For brevity, the TKT is identified with the multiplet , whose integer components are given by
 

However, the minimal case  cannot occur.

Remark.

It is adequate to view the TKTs  as equivalent. Since we have

Definition. The orbit  of any representative  is an invariant of the p-group  and is called its transfer kernel type, briefly TKT.

Remark. Let  denote the counter of total transfer kernels , which is an invariant of the group . In 1980, S. M. Chang and R. Foote proved that, for any odd prime  and for any integer , there exist metabelian p-groups  having abelianization  of type  such that . Only the elementary abelian -group  has . See Figure 5.

In the following concrete examples for the counters , and also in the remainder of this article, we use identifiers of finite p-groups in the SmallGroups Library by H. U. Besche, B. Eick and E. A. O'Brien.

For , we have

  for the extra special group  of exponent  with TKT  (Figure 6),
  for the two groups  with TKTs  (Figures 8 and 9),
  for the group  with TKT  (Figure 4 in the article on descendant trees),
  for the group  with TKT  (Figure 6),
  for the extra special group  of exponent  with TKT  (Figure 6).

Abelianization of type (p2,p)
Let  be a p-group with abelianization  of non-elementary abelian type  Then  possesses  maximal subgroups  of index  and  subgroups  of index 

Assumption. Suppose

is the distinguished maximal subgroup and

First layer
For each , let  denote the Artin transfer homomorphism.

Definition.

Remark.

Second layer

Definition.

Transfer kernel type

Remark.

Since we have

Therefore,  is another representative of the orbit  of  under the action:

Definition. The orbit  of any representative  is an invariant of the p-group  and is called its transfer kernel type, briefly TKT.

Connections between layers

There are two options regarding the intermediate subgroups

 For the subgroups  only the distinguished maximal subgroup  is an intermediate subgroup.
 For the Frattini subgroup  all maximal subgroups  are intermediate subgroups.

This causes restrictions for the transfer kernel type  of the second layer, since

and thus

But even

Inheritance from quotients
The common feature of all parent-descendant relations between finite p-groups is that the parent  is a quotient  of the descendant  by a suitable normal subgroup  Thus, an equivalent definition can be given by selecting an epimorphism  with  Then the group  can be viewed as the parent of the descendant .

In the following sections, this point of view will be taken, generally for arbitrary groups, not only for finite p-groups.

Passing through the abelianization

Proposition. Let  denote the canonical projection map.

Proof. This statement is a consequence of the second Corollary in the article on the induced homomorphism.

 is a homomorphism, let  be arbitrary, then:

TTT singulets

Proposition.

Proof. This claim is a consequence of the Main Theorem in the article on the induced homomorphism. Nevertheless, an independent proof is given as follows: first, the image of the commutator subgroup is

Second, the epimorphism  can be restricted to an epimorphism . According to the previous section, the composite epimorphism  factors through  by means of a uniquely determined epimorphism  such that . Consequently, we have .

Finally, if , then  is an isomorphism, since .

Definition.

TKT singulets

Proposition.

Proof. Then we have a disjoint union:

Consider the image of this disjoint union, which is not necessarily disjoint,

and let  We have:

Let  be the epimorphism from the previous proposition. We have:

Finally, if , then by the previous proposition  is an isomorphism. Using its inverse we get , which proves

Combining the inclusions we have:

Definition. In view of the results in the present section, we are able to define a partial order of transfer kernels by setting , when

TTT and TKT multiplets

Let  denote the family of all subgroups containing  (making it a finite family of normal subgroups). For each  let:

Due to the rules for singulets, established in the preceding two sections, these multiplets of TTTs and TKTs obey the following fundamental inheritance laws:

Inheritance Law II.

Inherited automorphisms
A further inheritance property does not immediately concern Artin transfers but will prove to be useful in applications to descendant trees.

Inheritance Law III. Assume  are as above and  If  then there exists a unique epimorphism  such that . If  then 

Proof. Using the isomorphism  we define:

First we show this map is well-defined:

The fact that  is surjective, a homomorphism and satisfies  are easily verified.

Let  be the canonical projection then there exists a unique induced automorphism  such that , that is,

This can be seen by applying the epimorphism  to the equation  which yields

Stabilization criteria
In this section, the results concerning the inheritance of TTTs and TKTs from quotients in the previous section are applied to the simplest case, which is characterized by the following

Assumption.

Under this assumption,
the kernels and targets of Artin transfers turn out to be compatible with parent-descendant relations between finite p-groups.

Compatibility criterion. Let  be a prime number. Suppose that  is a non-abelian finite p-group of nilpotency class .

The simple reason for this fact is that, for any subgroup , we have , since .

For the remaining part of this section, the investigated groups are supposed to be finite metabelian p-groups  with elementary abelianization  of rank , that is of type .

Partial stabilization for maximal class. A metabelian p-group  of coclass  and of nilpotency class  shares the last  components of the TTT  and of the TKT  with its parent .

This criterion is due to the fact that  implies ,

The condition  is indeed necessary for the partial stabilization criterion. For odd primes , the extra special -group  of order  and exponent  has nilpotency class  only, and the last  components of its TKT  are strictly smaller than the corresponding components of the TKT  of its parent  which is the elementary abelian -group of type .

For , both extra special -groups of coclass  and class , the ordinary quaternion group  with TKT  and the dihedral group  with TKT , have strictly smaller last two components of their TKTs than their common parent  with TKT .

Total stabilization for maximal class and positive defect.

A metabelian p-group  of coclass  and of nilpotency class , that is, with index of nilpotency , shares all  components of the TTT  and of the TKT  with its parent , provided it has positive defect of commutativity .

Note that  implies , and we have  for all .

This statement can be seen by observing that the conditions  and  imply ,

The condition  is indeed necessary for total stabilization. To see this it suffices to consider the first component of the TKT only.

Partial stabilization for non-maximal class.

Let  be fixed. A metabelian 3-group  with abelianization , coclass  and nilpotency class  shares the last two (among the four) components of the TTT  and of the TKT  with its parent .

This criterion is justified by the following consideration. If , then 

The condition  is indeed unavoidable for partial stabilization, since there exist several -groups of class , for instance those with SmallGroups identifiers , such that the last two components of their TKTs  are strictly smaller than the last two components of the TKT  of their common parent .

Total stabilization for non-maximal class and cyclic centre.

Again, let  be fixed.
A metabelian 3-group  with abelianization , coclass , nilpotency class  and cyclic centre  shares all four components of the TTT  and of the TKT  with its parent .

The reason is that, due to the cyclic centre, we have 

The condition of a cyclic centre is indeed necessary for total stabilization, since for a group with bicyclic centre there occur two possibilities.

Summarizing, we can say that the last four criteria underpin the fact that Artin transfers provide a marvellous tool for classifying finite p-groups.

In the following sections, it will be shown how these ideas can be applied for endowing descendant trees with additional structure, and for searching particular groups in descendant trees by looking for patterns defined by the kernels and targets of Artin transfers. These strategies of pattern recognition are useful in pure group theory and in algebraic number theory.

Structured descendant trees (SDTs)
This section uses the terminology of descendant trees in the theory of finite p-groups.
In Figure 4, a descendant tree with modest complexity is selected exemplarily to demonstrate how Artin transfers provide additional structure for each vertex of the tree.
The root of the tree is the metabelian -group with identifier , that is, a group of order  and with counting number . This root is not coclass settled, whence its entire descendant tree  is of considerably higher complexity than the coclass- subtree , whose first six branches are drawn in the diagram of Figure 4.
The additional structure can be viewed as a sort of coordinate system in which the tree is embedded. The horizontal abscissa is labelled with the transfer kernel type (TKT) , and the vertical ordinate is labelled with a single component  of the transfer target type (TTT). The vertices of the tree are drawn in such a manner that members of periodic infinite sequences form a vertical column sharing a common TKT. On the other hand, metabelian groups of a fixed order, represented by vertices of depth at most , form a horizontal row sharing a common first component of the TTT. (To discourage any incorrect interpretations, we explicitly point out that the first component of the TTT of non-metabelian groups or metabelian groups, represented by vertices of depth , is usually smaller than expected, due to stabilization phenomena!) (The latter notation is employed in Figure 4.)

Pattern recognition
For searching a particular group in a descendant tree by looking for patterns defined by the kernels and targets of Artin transfers, it is frequently adequate to reduce the number of vertices in the branches of a dense tree with high complexity by sifting groups with desired special properties, for example

 filtering the -groups,
 eliminating a set of certain transfer kernel types,
 cancelling all non-metabelian groups (indicated by small contour squares in Fig. 4),
 removing metabelian groups with cyclic centre (denoted by small full disks in Fig. 4),
 cutting off vertices whose distance from the mainline (depth) exceeds some lower bound,
 combining several different sifting criteria.

The result of such a sieving procedure is called a pruned descendant tree with respect to the desired set of properties.
However, in any case, it should be avoided that the main line of a coclass tree is eliminated, since the result would be a disconnected infinite set of finite graphs instead of a tree.
For example, it is neither recommended to eliminate all -groups in Figure 4 nor to eliminate all groups with TKT .
In Figure 4, the big double contour rectangle surrounds the pruned coclass tree , where the numerous vertices with TKT  are completely eliminated. This would, for instance, be useful for searching a -group with TKT  and first component  of the TTT. In this case, the search result would even be a unique group. We expand this idea further in the following detailed discussion of an important example.

Historical example
The oldest example of searching for a finite p-group by the strategy of pattern recognition via Artin transfers goes back to 1934, when A. Scholz and O. Taussky

However, it needed  years until M. R. Bush and D. C. Mayer, in 2012, provided the first rigorous proof

The search is performed with the aid of the p-group generation algorithm by M. F. Newman

and E. A. O'Brien.

For the initialization of the algorithm, two basic invariants must be determined. Firstly, the generator rank  of the p-groups to be constructed. These two invariants indicate the root of the descendant tree which will be constructed successively. Although the p-group generation algorithm is designed to use the parent-descendant definition by means of the lower exponent-p central series, it can be fitted to the definition with the aid of the usual lower central series. In the case of an elementary abelian p-group as root, the difference is not very big. So we have to start with the elementary abelian -group of rank two, which has the SmallGroups identifier , and to construct the descendant tree . We do that by iterating the p-group generation algorithm, taking suitable capable descendants of the previous root as the next root, always executing an increment of the nilpotency class by a unit.

Further, any quotient of  must be a -group, enforced by number theoretic requirements for the quadratic field .

The root  has only a single capable descendant  of type . Since the latter has nuclear rank two, there occurs a bifurcation , where the former component  can be eliminated by the stabilization criterion  for the TKT of all -groups of maximal class.

Commutator calculus
This section shows exemplarily how commutator calculus can be used for determining the kernels and targets of Artin transfers explicitly. As a concrete example we take the metabelian -groups with bicyclic centre, which are represented by big full disks as vertices, of the coclass tree diagram in Figure 4. They form ten periodic infinite sequences, four, resp. six, for even, resp. odd, nilpotency class , and can be characterized with the aid of a parametrized polycyclic power-commutator presentation:

This phenomenon is called a polarization, more precisely a uni-polarization, at the first component.

For even nilpotency class, the two groups of types H.4 and E.14, which differ in the sign of the parameter  only, are isomorphic.

These statements can be deduced by means of the following considerations.

As a preparation, it is useful to compile a list of some commutator relations, starting with those given in the presentation,
By means of the right product rule  and the right power rule ,

Their derived subgroups are crucial for the behavior of the Artin transfers. By making use of the general formula , where , and where we know that  in the present situation, it follows that

Note that  is not far from being abelian, since  is contained in the centre .

As the first main result, we are now in the position to determine the abelian type invariants of the derived quotients:

Now we come to the kernels of the Artin transfer homomorphisms . It suffices to investigate the induced transfers  and to begin by finding expressions for the images  of elements , which can be expressed in the form

First, we exploit outer transfers as much as possible:

Next, we treat the unavoidable inner transfers, which are more intricate. For this purpose, we use the polynomial identity

to obtain:

Finally, we combine the results: generally

and in particular,

To determine the kernels, it remains to solve the equations:

The following equivalences, for any , finish the justification of the statements:

  both arbitrary .
  with arbitrary ,
  with arbitrary ,
 ,
 

Consequently, the last three components of the TKT are independent of the parameters  which means that both, the TTT and the TKT, reveal a uni-polarization at the first component.

Systematic library of SDTs
The aim of this section is to present a collection of structured coclass trees (SCTs) of finite p-groups with parametrized presentations and a succinct summary of invariants.
The underlying prime  is restricted to small values .
The trees are arranged according to increasing coclass  and different abelianizations within each coclass.
To keep the descendant numbers manageable, the trees are pruned by eliminating vertices of depth bigger than one.
Further, we omit trees where stabilization criteria enforce a common TKT of all vertices, since we do not consider such trees as structured any more.
The invariants listed include

 pre-period and period length,
 depth and width of branches,
 uni-polarization, TTT and TKT,
 -groups.

We refrain from giving justifications for invariants, since the way how invariants are derived from presentations was demonstrated exemplarily in the section on commutator calculus

Coclass 1
In the last case, the tree is restricted to metabelian -groups.

The -groups of coclass  in Figure 5 can be defined by the following parametrized polycyclic pc-presentation, quite different from Blackburn's presentation.

The branches are strictly periodic with pre-period  and period length , and have depth  and width .

The -groups of coclass  in Figure 6 can be defined by the following parametrized polycyclic pc-presentation, slightly different from Blackburn's presentation.

The branches are strictly periodic with pre-period  and period length , and have depth  and width . Mainline vertices and vertices on odd branches are -groups.

The metabelian -groups of coclass  in Figure 7 can be defined by the following parametrized polycyclic pc-presentation, slightly different from Miech's presentation.

The (metabelian!) branches are strictly periodic with pre-period  and period length , and have depth  and width . (The branches of the complete tree, including non-metabelian groups, are only virtually periodic and have bounded width but unbounded depth!) Mainline vertices and vertices on odd branches are -groups.

Coclass 2

Abelianization of type (p,p)

On the tree , the -groups of coclass  with bicyclic centre in Figure 8 can be defined by the following parametrized polycyclic pc-presentation.

The branches are strictly periodic with pre-period  and period length , and have depth  and width .
The TKT depends on the parameters and is
Mainline vertices and vertices on even branches are -groups.

On the tree , the -groups of coclass  with bicyclic centre in Figure 9 can be defined by the following parametrized polycyclic pc-presentation.

The branches are strictly periodic with pre-period  and period length , and have depth  and width .
The TKT depends on the parameters and is
Mainline vertices and vertices on even branches are -groups.

Abelianization of type (p2,p)

Abelianization of type (p,p,p)

Coclass 3

Abelianization of type (p2,p)

Abelianization of type (p,p,p)

Arithmetical applications
In algebraic number theory and class field theory, structured descendant trees (SDTs) of finite p-groups provide an excellent tool for

 visualizing the location of various non-abelian p-groups  associated with algebraic number fields ,
 displaying additional information about the groups  in labels attached to corresponding vertices, and
 emphasizing the periodicity of occurrences of the groups  on branches of coclass trees.

Given a sequence of algebraic number fields  with fixed signature , ordered by the absolute values of their discriminants , a suitable structured coclass tree (SCT) , or also the finite sporadic part  of a coclass graph , whose vertices are entirely or partially realized by second p-class groups  of the fields  is endowed with additional arithmetical structure when each realized vertex , resp. , is mapped to data concerning the fields  such that .

Example
To be specific, let  and consider complex quadratic fields  with fixed signature  having -class groups with type invariants . See OEIS A242863 . Their second -class groups  have been determined by D. C. Mayer
 for the range , and, most recently, by N. Boston, M. R. Bush and F. Hajir for the extended range .

Then we obtain the arithmetically structured coclass trees (ASCTs) in Figures 10 and 11, which, in particular, give an impression of the actual distribution of second -class groups. See OEIS A242878 .

Concerning the periodicity of occurrences of second -class groups  of complex quadratic fields, it was proved that only every other branch of the trees in Figures 10 and 11 can be populated by these metabelian -groups and that the distribution sets in with a ground state (GS) on branch  and continues with higher excited states (ES) on the branches  with even . This periodicity phenomenon is underpinned by three sequences with fixed TKTs

 E.14 , OEIS A247693 ,
 E.6 , OEIS A247692 ,
 H.4 , OEIS A247694 

on the ASCT , and by three sequences with fixed TKTs

 E.9 , OEIS A247696 ,
 E.8 , OEIS A247695 ,
 G.16 ,OEIS A247697 

on the ASCT . Up to now, the ground state and three excited states are known for each of the six sequences, and for TKT E.9  even the fourth excited state occurred already. The minimal absolute discriminants of the various states of each of the six periodic sequences are presented in Table 2. Data for the ground states (GS) and the first excited states (ES1) has been taken from D. C. Mayer, most recent information on the second, third and fourth excited states (ES2, ES3, ES4) is due to N. Boston, M. R. Bush and F. Hajir.

In contrast, let us secondly select the sporadic part  of the coclass graph  for demonstrating that another way of attaching additional arithmetical structure to descendant trees is to display the counter  of hits of a realized vertex  by the second -class group  of fields with absolute discriminants below a given upper bound , for instance . With respect to the total counter  of all complex quadratic fields with -class group of type  and discriminant , this gives the relative frequency as an approximation to the asymptotic density of the population in Figure 12 and Table 3.

 , OEIS A247689 ,
 , OEIS A247690 ,
 , OEIS A242873 ,
 , OEIS A247688 .

Comparison of various primes
Now let  and consider complex quadratic fields  with fixed signature  and p-class groups of type . The dominant part of the second p-class groups of these fields populates the top vertices of order  of the sporadic part  of the coclass graph , which belong to the stem of P. Hall's isoclinism family , or their immediate descendants of order . For , the TKT of Schur -groups is a permutation whose cycle decomposition does not contain transpositions, whereas the TKT of roots of finite trees is a compositum of disjoint transpositions having an even number ( or ) of fixed points.

We endow the forest  (a finite union of descendant trees) with additional arithmetical structure by attaching the minimal absolute discriminant  to each realized'' vertex .

References

Group theory
Class field theory